Dimítrios Chondrokoúkis (born January 26, 1988) is a Greek-Cypriot high jumper who competes internationally for Cyprus, since 2013. He won the gold medal at the 2012 Word Indoor Championships in Istanbul with a personal best of 2.33 meters representing Greece at the time. His personal best in the outdoor track is 2.32 m, achieved twice in Izmir in June 2011 and in the final at the 2011 World Championships in Athletics in Daegu, South Korea on 1 September 2011.

In July 2012, it was announced Chondrokoúkis tested positive for the performance-enhancing drug stanozolol, an anabolic steroid.  As a result, he was forced to withdraw from the 2012 Summer Olympics.

Chondrokoúkis was born in Marousi. In June 2013, KOEAS (Cyprus Amateur Athletic Federation) announced that he would represent Cyprus, since his mother was from Karavas, Keryneia.

Personal bests

Honours

References

External links

1988 births
Living people
Greek male high jumpers
Cypriot male high jumpers
Athletes from Athens
Olympiacos Athletics athletes
Greek sportspeople in doping cases
World Athletics Championships athletes for Greece
World Athletics Championships athletes for Cyprus
Athletes (track and field) at the 2016 Summer Olympics
Olympic athletes of Cyprus
Doping cases in athletics
World Athletics Indoor Championships winners
European Games competitors for Cyprus
Athletes (track and field) at the 2019 European Games